First-seeded Roger Federer defeated Mikhail Youzhny 6-4, 6-3 to win the 2007 Dubai Tennis Championships singles event.

Seeds

Draw

Finals

Section 1

Section 2

External links
 Singles draw
 Singles qualifying draw

Men's Singles
2007 ATP Tour